Paulo Sérgio Oliveira da Silva (19 October 1974 – 27 October 2004), better known as Serginho, was a Brazilian footballer.

Serginho started his career in the town of Coronel Fabriciano, Minas Gerais state, Brazil. He played for São Caetano as a defender, and was playing for his team in a Campeonato Brasileiro match against São Paulo on 27 October 2004 when he suffered a fatal cardiac arrest 60 minutes into the match. A later autopsy showed Serginho's heart to weigh 600 grams, twice the size of an average human heart.

With São Caetano, Serginho won the 2nd division of Campeonato Paulista in 2000, and the first division in 2004, and was runner-up in two Campeonatos Brasileiros and one Copa Libertadores.

See also
 List of association footballers who died while playing

External links 
 

People from Vitória, Espírito Santo
Brazilian footballers
Association football players who died while playing
Associação Desportiva São Caetano players
Sport deaths in Brazil
1974 births
2004 deaths
Association football defenders
Filmed deaths in sports
Sportspeople from Espírito Santo